Osage Township is a township in Bourbon County, Kansas, USA.  As of the 2000 census, its population was 394.

Geography
According to the USGS, it contains four cemeteries: Barnesville, Fairview, Maple Grove and West Liberty.

The Little Osage River and smaller streams of Fish Creek, Indian Creek and Moores Branch run through this township. Fish Creek, Indian Creek and Moores Branch all enter the Little Osage in Osage Township.

Transportation
Osage Township contains two airports or landing strips: Emmerson Airport and Lyons Field.

Further reading

References

 USGS Geographic Names Information System (GNIS)

External links
 City-Data.com
 Bourbon County Maps: Current, Historic Collection

Townships in Bourbon County, Kansas
Townships in Kansas